Chahe is a town in Honghu, Hubei. , it administers Chahu Residential Community, Lihu Fishing Farm Residential Zone, as well as the following eighteen villages:
Chahe Village
Xiaogang Village
Shuanghe Village
Hongfeng Village
Longkeng Village
Longjia Village
Chenyan Village
Yongxing Village
Xingfu Village
Yingnan Village
Shiyangwan Village
Yanshagan Village
Baiyun Village
Hongsan Village
Xichi Village
Xinxue Village
Wufeng Village
Shuijing Village

References

Honghu
Township-level divisions of Hubei